McRae Canyon originally known as Cañon del Muerto, is a canyon in the southern Fra Cristobal Range in Sierra County, New Mexico.

Just below this confluence is an artesian spring, that flows continuously from the Jornada del Muerto basin aquifer.

McRae Canyon is the site of Fort McRae manned by California Volunteers of the Union Army from 1863 to 1866, and by U. S. Army soldiers from 1866 to 1876.

References

-

Landforms of Sierra County, New Mexico
Canyons and gorges of New Mexico